20 Vodka Jellies is a compilation album by Scottish musician Momus, released in 1996. The album's cover describes it as "an assortment of curiosities and rarities," and it is a collection of unreleased demos, a few new songs, B-sides, and outtakes. Much of the album reflects Momus's involvement with Shibuya-kei music. It has been described as "one of Momus' strongest and most accessible efforts."

Track listing

References

1996 compilation albums
Momus (musician) albums